Chokkadi High School is located in Kukkujadka which is in Amaramudnooru village, 12 km from Sullia taluk in Dakshina Kannada district, Karnataka, India.  

The school attracts students from Doddathota and Chokkadi for their education. Noted alumni of the school include MLA Angara S who completed his SSLC here.

Chandrashekhar Bhat, school teacher of the school was awarded the district-level best teacher award by the department of Public instruction in the year 2013.

References

Schools in Dakshina Kannada district